Probe is a 1972 American made-for-television crime sci-fi thriller film produced as a pilot for a science fiction detective series, originally to have continued under that title. Created by Leslie Stevens, it starred Hugh O'Brian as Hugh Lockwood, one of a group of high-tech private eyes working for the organization "World Securities Corp."  When picked up for series production, the title was changed to Search, because Probe was the name of an existing PBS series. The film originally aired February 21, 1972 on NBC.

The investigators, called Probes, were outfitted with various electronic implants including a button-sized "scanner" containing a miniaturized video camera, microphone and transmitter linked to a team of technicians and experts who constantly monitored the Probe's surroundings, actions and vital signs; they were able to supply the Probe with encyclopedic information on any subject.

Lockwood, designated "Probe One", was a former American astronaut.  In the pilot, he sets out for Europe to track down a multimillion-pound stash of gemstones amassed by Hermann Goering during World War II.

The pilot has been released as a publish-on-demand DVD-R on August 1, 2011.

Cast
 Hugh O'Brian as Hugh Lockwood
 Elke Sommer as Heideline "Uli" Ullman
 Burgess Meredith as V.C.R. Cameron
 Lilia Skala as Frieda Ullman
 Angel Tompkins as Gloria Harding
 John Gielgud as Harold L. Streeter
 Kent Smith as Dr. Edward Laurent
 Alfred Ryder as Cheyne
 Ben Wright as Kurt van Niestat
 Robert Boon as Felix Ernst
 Albert Popwell as Dr. Griffin
 A Martinez as Carlos Lobos
 Byron Chung as Kuroda
 Ginny Golden as Ginny Keach
 Jules Maitland as Reinhardt Brugge

Probe Control
Probe agents reported to V.C. Cameron (Burgess Meredith), the "director" of the investigations, who ran Probe Control, a center patterned on the NASA Mission Control Center.  "Cam" was the leader of the expert team who monitored and provided the agent with intelligence. Early in the series the Probe Control set was placed in a darkened isolated space, alluding to a large scale operations center. By the middle of the season, the control room was scaled down and relocated to a well-lit but smaller "bunker rush" room.  According to the show's credits, the computer equipment was provided by Control Data Corporation.

The building used as the headquarters for World Securities Corporation is currently the headquarters for Bank of America in San Francisco.

References

External links
 
 Probe title sequence 1972

1972 television films
1972 films
1970s science fiction thriller films
American science fiction thriller films
NBC network original films
Television films as pilots
Films scored by Dominic Frontiere
Films directed by Russ Mayberry
1970s American films